Things to Come is the second English album by German singer Peter Schilling and is the English counterpart to the German album 120 Grad.

Track listing
 "Chill of the Night"
 "City of the Night (Berlin)"
 "Lone Survivor"
 "The Hurricane (Hammers on the Shore)"
 "Where You Are I Am"
 "Things to Come"
 "Terra Titanic (Lost to the Sea)"
 "Zone 804"
 "10,000 Points"

1985 albums
Peter Schilling albums
Elektra Records albums